Liu Shuahe was a popular Chinese yuanben (or zaju) actor of the late Jin dynasty (1115–1234) who was active in the first half of the 13th century. He was a group leader of the Court Entertainment Bureau, and some yuanben and zaju plays were written about him.

Du Renjie in his sanqu Zhuangjia bushi goulan referred to him as a "legendary celebrity". A source mentioned a great male actor surnamed Liu during the early Yuan dynasty who was good at kefan, or comedy skills, but it's unclear whether he was indeed Liu Shuahe.

Liu Shuahe's sons-in-law Hua Lilang and Hongzi Li Er were both actors-turned-playwrights.

References

13th-century Chinese male actors
Jin dynasty (1115–1234) musicians